Zăvoaia is a commune located in Brăila County, Muntenia, Romania. It is composed of two villages, Dudescu and Zăvoaia.

References 

Communes in Brăila County
Localities in Muntenia